Legislative elections were held in South West Africa on 3 July 1929. The whites-only election saw a victory for the United National South West Party, which won seven of the twelve elected seats in the Legislative Assembly.

Electoral system
The Legislative Assembly had 18 seats, of which twelve were elected in single-member constituencies, and six were appointed by the territory's Administrator, Albertus Johannes Werth. The twelve constituencies were Gibeon, Gobabis, Grootfontein, Keetmanshoop, Kolmanskop, Luderitz, Okahandja, Omaruru, Swakopmund, Warmbad, Windhoek Central and Windhoek District.

Results
One seat, Grootfontein, was won unopposed by the German League in South West Africa. Of the six members appointed by Werth, three were from the German League and three from the United National South West Party.

References

South West Africa
1929 in South West Africa
Elections in Namibia
Election and referendum articles with incomplete results